The Miami Rock Ridge is a continuous limestone outcrop which formerly encompassed a large extent of far South Florida, including portions of the Everglades ecosystem. The traditional base of the elevation ranges from northern Miami-Dade County, Florida (the approximate latitude of North Miami Beach) southward to the upper Florida Keys, and it extends southwest into Everglades National Park.

The coastal ridge was traditionally a component of the endangered pine rocklands, which grew upon the length of the ridge. The environmental community consisted of a large and continuous expanse of South Florida Slash Pines (Pinus elliottii var. densa), which was interspersed by tropical hardwood hammocks. The globally imperiled pine rockland community, which also encompassed the Florida Keys and The Bahamas, supported numerous endemic plant species; 20 percent occur nowhere else in the world. The communities of the Miami Rock Ridge are maintained by wildfires, including natural fires caused by lightning strikes; this affects the vegetation and its associated inhabitants, thus maintaining a diverse ecosystem. The substrate—often consisting of marl—and climate also affects the height of vegetation; thus a mature subtropical hammock typically does not exceed  on the Miami Rock Ridge. Today the original communities have been largely removed by development, and the remaining pieces of the ecosystems are scattered into tiny fragments in extreme southeast Florida; they now encompass small fractions of their original range. Simpson Park Hammock and Alice Wainwright Park contain small fragments of tropical hardwood hammock.

Gallery

References

Geography of Florida